The Springfield, Athol and North–eastern Railroad was a railroad that operated in the northeast United States in the 19th century.

History 
The Athol and Enfield Railroad was chartered in 1869, and succeeded by the Springfield, Athol and North-eastern Railroad in 1873, opening in 1873 as a branch from Athol Junction in Springfield to the Vermont and Massachusetts Railroad in Athol. The Boston and Albany Railroad bought the line in 1880. The majority of the line was closed in the 1930s due to the formation of the Quabbin Reservoir.

A  rail trail, the Rabbit Run Trail, is planned for the remaining portion of right-of-way in Athol and New Salem.

References

Further reading

External links

Springfield, Athol and North-eastern Railroad (Digital Commonwealth)
History of Ludlow, Massachusetts (Including B&A Athol Branch and Hampden Railroad)

Defunct Massachusetts railroads
Springfield, Athol and North-eastern
Predecessors of the New York Central Railroad
Railway companies established in 1873
Railway companies disestablished in 1879
American companies disestablished in 1879
American companies established in 1873